Stonewall is an unincorporated community and census-designated place (CDP) in Gillespie County, Texas, United States. The population was 525 at the 2010 census. It was named for Confederate General Thomas J. (Stonewall) Jackson, by Israel P. Nunez who established a stage station near the site in 1870.

History
It was named for Confederate General Thomas J. (Stonewall) Jackson, by Israel P. Nunez who established a stage station near the site in 1870.

Stonewall was the home of former U.S. President Lyndon B. Johnson, and the "LBJ Ranch" is located nearby.

Geography

Stonewall is located in eastern Gillespie County on the Pedernales River, in the Hill Country of central Texas. U.S. Route 290 passes through the community, leading west  to Fredericksburg, the Gillespie County seat, and east  to Johnson City.

The Pedernales River flows from west to east just north of the center of town.

Climate
The climate in this area is characterized by hot, humid summers and generally mild to cool winters. According to the Köppen climate classification system, Stonewall has a humid subtropical climate, Cfa on climate maps.

Demographics
As of the census of 2000, there were 469 people, 176 households, and 133 families residing in the CDP. The population density was 30.9 people per square mile (11.9/km2). There were 203 housing units at an average density of 13.4/sq mi (5.2/km2). The racial makeup of the CDP was 81.24% White, 17.91% from other races, and 0.85% from two or more races. Hispanic or Latino of any race were 35.18% of the population.

There were 176 households which 34.1% had children under the age of 18 living with them, 58.0% were married couples living together, 13.6% had a female householder with no husband present, and 24.4% were non-families. 20.5% of all households were made up of individuals, and 10.8% had someone living alone who was 65 years of age or older. The average household size was 2.66 and the average family size was 3.07.

In the CDP, the population was spread out, with 28.1% under the age of 18, 7.7% from 18 to 24, 22.6% from 25 to 44, 22.4% from 45 to 64, and 19.2% who were 65 years of age or older. The median age was 37 years. For every 100 females, there were 103.0 males. For every 100 females age 18 and over, there were 92.6 males.

The median income for a household in the CDP was $36,210, and the median income for a family was $37,721. Males had a median income of $29,531 versus $30,083 for females. The per capita income for the CDP was $22,035. About 19.3% of families and 17.1% of the population were below the poverty line, including 30.2% of those under age 18 and 32.0% of those age 65 or over.

Education
Stonewall is served by the Fredericksburg Independent School District.

References

External links
 
 Stonewall Texas Chamber of Commerce

Census-designated places in Gillespie County, Texas
Census-designated places in Texas
Unincorporated communities in Gillespie County, Texas
Unincorporated communities in Texas
Populated places established in 1870
1870 establishments in Texas